Image of Victory (Hebrew: תמונת הניצחון) is a 2021 Israeli film directed by Avi Nesher. The film includes a reenactment of the battle and subsequent loss of Kibbutz Nitzanim during Israel’s War of Independence and is based on real events.

The film was nominated for fifteen categories in the 2021 Ophir Awards and won three of them: Best Cinematography, Best Makeup, and Best Costume Design.

Plot 
The story takes place between late 1947 and June 1948, and focuses mainly on the days before the Battle of Nitzanim and on the battle itself (7 June 1948), at the end of which Nitzanim is successfully conquered and the surviving defenders are taken prisoners.

A young Egyptian journalist, Hassanein (Amir Khoury), accompanies an Egyptian volunteer fighting force heading to aid the Palestinian Arabs, as a director of a propaganda film to capture an "image of victory" of the Egyptian Army. They set camp the foot of the kibbutz within which the members, together with a platoon of the Givati Brigade, prepare to defend.

Cast 
Source:

Reception 
Hannah Brown in a review by The Jerusalem Post called the film "a great anti-war epic". She praised it as "not so much a political movie as an existential statement about the price paid, quite literally, for the image of the title. Image of Victory is the crowning achievement of Nesher’s career and it is the rare movie that may change the way you look at the world."

Leslie Felperin of The Guardian was more critical, writing that "A film that tries to empathise with everybody runs the risk of pleasing no one, and no doubt there will be viewers enraged by this or that detail or unspoken perspective, but the ambition is nevertheless pretty impressive and on the whole well executed."

References

External links 

 
 
 "East Bay Jewish film fest: An Egyptian journalist, a young mother and a defeat in early Israel", Dan Pine, 9 March 2022, The Jewish News of Northern California

Films directed by Avi Nesher
2021 films
2020s Arabic-language films
2020s Hebrew-language films
Israeli war drama films
Israeli multilingual films